Field Days (The Amanda Loops) is a studio album by English guitarist, composer and improvisor Fred Frith. It comprises 14 pieces for dance written by Frith for choreographer Amanda Miller and the Nederland Dans Theater. The album was released by Fred Records in November 2015.

Track listing
All tracks composed by Fred Frith.

Sources: AllMusic, Discogs, SquidCo

Personnel
Fred Frith – all other instruments
Carla Kihlstedt – Nyckelharpa, violin
Kiku Day – Shakuhachi
Daan Vandewalle – piano
William Winant – percussion
Lotte Anker – saxophone
Arte Sax Quartet – saxophones
Arditti Quartet – strings

Sources: Discogs, SquidCo

Sound and artwork
Recorded at Guerilla Recordings, Oakland, California, 2011.
Myles Boisen – engineer
Fred Frith – producer

Source: Discogs

References

2015 albums
Fred Frith albums
Fred Records albums
Albums produced by Fred Frith